Shaker Mahmoud Hamza (born 5 May 1963) is an Iraqi football midfielder who played for Iraq in the 1986 FIFA World Cup. He also played for Al-Shabab.

He helped Iraq to their second Olympic Games in 1984 in Los Angeles, United States, where he played in all three games against Canada, Cameroon and Yugoslavia. Two years later, he played in the World Cup in Mexico, making a second half substitute appearance for Anad Abid in Iraq’s last game against the hosts. He scored the last goal in the 3-1 win over Syria that qualified Iraq for their first ever World Cup appearance.

Career statistics

International goals
Scores and results list Iraq's goal tally first.

Managerial statistics

References

External links
FIFA profile

1963 births
Iraqi footballers
Iraq international footballers
Association football midfielders
1986 FIFA World Cup players
Living people
Al-Shorta SC players
Al-Shorta SC managers
Iraqi football managers